Curry County is the name of two counties in the United States:

 Curry County, New Mexico 
 Curry County, Oregon